FAAD may refer to:

 a fellow of the American Academy of Dermatology
 Freeware Advanced Audio Decoder, an AAC audio decoder, superseded by new version: FAAD2